Jamila is a feminine Arabic given name.

Jamila may also refer to:
Jamila (doll), a fashion doll marketed in the Middle East
Jamila (novel), by Chinghiz Aitmatov
Jamila (film), a South Sudanese film
Jamila (Ultra monster), a monster character in Ultraman
"Jamila", a song by Jose Chameleone
"Jamila", a song by Unknown to No One
Al Jamila, an Arabic magazine

See also
Djémila, an Algerian village
"Jamillia", a song by Disco Biscuits from Uncivilized Area
Gamil (disambiguation)